The UPF-Centre for Animal Ethics (UPF-CAE) is an animal advocacy think tank based at Pompeu Fabra University. It aims to disseminate and promote non-anthropocentric and non-speciesist ethical perspectives in academia, politics and the media. The centre was established in December 2015 and is the first centre of its kind in both Catalonia and Spain. Its main activities include the co-organization of the 6th Conference of the European Association for Critical Animal Studies, together with the European Association for Critical Animal Studies. The centre's Media Observatory of Speciesism was launched in 2018, it analyzes the treatment of animals in the media from an anti-speciesist perspective and makes recommendations for ending speciesism in the media.

See also 
 Animal Ethics (organization)
 Oxford Centre for Animal Ethics

References

External links 
 

2015 establishments in Catalonia
Animal ethics organizations
Animal rights organizations
Animal welfare organisations based in Spain
Organisations based in Barcelona
Organizations established in 2015
Pompeu Fabra University
Think tanks based in Spain